The 2000 Hong Kong Women's Sevens was the third edition of the tournament. It took place between the 22–24 March, 2000. It also featured the first official appearance of the New Zealand women's team since the tournament began in 1997.

Tournament
Games involving the Arabian Gulf, Hong Kong, Japan, Kazakhstan, Singapore and Thailand comprised the 2000 Asian Women's Sevens championship.

Pool stages
Pool A

Samoa 31–0 Arabian Gulf
New Zealand 41–0 Wales
Hong Kong 31–0 Thailand (Asian Sevens)
Samoa 22–10 Wales
Thailand 17–10 Arabian Gulf (Asian Sevens)
New Zealand 62–0 Hong Kong
Wales 25–0 Thailand
New Zealand 38–0 Samoa
Hong Kong 22–5 Arabian Gulf (Asian Sevens)
New Zealand 52–0 Thailand
Samoa 19–12 Hong Kong
Wales 54–0 Arabian Gulf
Samoa 53–0 Thailand
Wales 12–12 Hong Kong
New Zealand 50–0 Arabian Gulf

Pool B

Australia 56–0 Singapore
USA 29–0 Netherlands
Kazakhstan 19–5 Japan (Asian Sevens)
Australia 48–7 Netherlands
Kazakhstan 34–0 Singapore (Asian Sevens)
USA 35–0 Japan
Netherlands 10–5 Kazakhstan
USA 7–7 Australia
Japan 43–7 Singapore (Asian Sevens)
USA 14–0 Kazakhstan
Australia 29–5 Japan
Netherlands 29–5 Singapore
Australia 12–5 Kazakhstan
Netherlands 24–10 Japan
USA 50–0 Singapore

Classification Stages
Bowl

Plate

Cup

Asian Cup Final
Believed to be an additional match called an Asian Final, based on group standings.
Kazakhstan 41–0 Hong Kong

References

2000
2000 rugby sevens competitions
2000 in women's rugby union
2000 in Asian rugby union